"I Get Crazy" is a song by Trinidadian-American rapper and singer Nicki Minaj. It features Young Money label-mate Lil Wayne. The song was included on Minaj's Beam Me Up Scotty mixtape, finding minor success on the US Rap chart and R&B/Hip-Hop chart.

Background and recording
"I Get Crazy" was included on Minaj's mixtape Beam Me Up Scotty. The song was later release as a "street single" prior to the mixtape's official release after charting on the US Hot R&B/Hip-Hop Songs charts due to heavy airplay. In an interview with MTV News, Minaj described the song as a "real dope song". She revealed that after recording the track, she played it back for Lil Wayne who ended up adding his own verse into the song, causing Minaj to add an additional verse in the song. During Wayne's recording, he self-recorded his guitar back-beat, adding to the genre of the song. Discussing the songs merge of genres, Minaj stated:

Described as "bananas" by Felipe Delerme of The Fader, "I Get Crazy" features Minaj's distinct voice and powerful/aloof rap style, rapidly rapping with cocky lyrics. The song incorporates a sample that resembles a signature alarm from The Bomb Squad. When asked if the song would be performed on tour via-Twitter, Minaj revealed to fans that "I Get Crazy"  ranks as her least favorite collaboration with Wayne.

The song was officially released on streaming platforms, along with the rest of the mixtape and 3 new songs, in May 2021.

Reception

Critical reception
Felipe Delerme of FADER gave the song a positive review, stating that the combination of Minaj and Wayne would expectidely create a "literal, perfect and bananas interpretation of the phrase 'I get crazy'". Delerme continued praise of the track by jokingly stating "what if Lil Wayne and Nicki Minaj had a rap baby? It would be super cute and by the age of 12 its voice would sound like Condoleezza Rice with a pack a day habit.

Chart performance
"I Get Crazy" peaked on the Hot Rap Songs chart at number twenty the week ending December 26, 2009, and peaked on the Hot R&B/Hip-Hop Songs chart at number thirty-seven the week ending January 23, 2010.

Charts

References

2009 songs
Lil Wayne songs
Nicki Minaj songs
Songs written by Nicki Minaj
Songs written by Lil Wayne
Song recordings produced by Ron Browz
Songs written by Ron Browz